Zane Copeland, Jr. (born July 11, 1982), better known as Lil' Zane or simply Zane, is an American rapper. He is perhaps best known for his single "Callin' Me" (featuring 112) from his debut studio album Young World: The Future (2000).

Early life 
At age 10, Zane was inspired by Another Bad Creation and Kris Kross. He got more serious about his eventual career and started rehearsing with his cousin E. Greene. He was first recognized by his fans when he was in a group called Kronic signed to RCA Records. They were signed from 1993 to 1996. They never put out any projects. He began entering local Atlanta talent shows upon the dissolution of the group. Then in 1999, he started touring with 112 while recording his debut album.

Music career

1999–2002: Young World: The Future 
In 1999, his first ever single, "Money Stretch", was included in the Next Friday soundtrack. In 2000, Lil' Zane released his debut album Young World: The Future which featured his smash single "Callin Me". The album debut at No. 165 on the Billboard 200 with 7,000 copies sold in the first week but then peaked in its second week at No. 25 with 40,000 copies sold. To date the album sold 490,000 copies. The album also hit at No. 4 on the Top R&B/Hip-Hop Albums. In 2001, he made appearance on the Hardball soundtrack on the track of the same name with Bow Wow, Lil Wayne and Sammie. He later stated in an interview that he was working on an album titled It Ain't Over. He later decided to change the title to The Big Zane Theory.

2003: The Big Zane Theory 
In 2003, Lil Zane released his second album, The Big Zane Theory With the album, he formally changed his stage name from Lil' Zane to simply Zane. Copeland explained "Zane is my real name, that's the name that's on my birth certificate and my mom likes that name" for changing his name in a BallerStatus.net interview. The album failed to match the success of Zane's previous album, as it charted at No. 191 on the Billboard 200's chart with 6,423 copies sold. It also charted at No. 39 on the Top R&B/Hip-Hop Albums. The only single that was released on the album was "Tonite I'm Yours" which peaked at No. 87 on the Hot R&B/Hip-Hop Songs. The album sold 40,000 copies in total soon afterwards Zane would leave Priority Records due to lack of financial compensation, artist support, and promotion to go on a five-year hiatus from music to focus on his acting career.

2004–2008: Under the Radar and Tha Return 
On December 30, 2004, it was announced that Zane has formed a new record label by the name of "3 Mill Entertainment" together with MAM Group, Inc. He announced that he had started working on his third album, Under the Radar. The album was to feature artist like Real Young, Raz B, John B, Bone Crusher, Akon, Drum Up (LaMar and LaNelle Seymour), and Rich Boy. The album was going to get released in Spring 2005, but then was pushed back to fall and was never released. In late 2006 Zane started to work on another new album, Tha Return. The album was released on February 26, 2008. The album failed to match the success of Zane's previous albums, as it failed to make it to any Billboard charts. The only single that was released on the album was "Like This" which also failed to chart also. The single has gotten over 150,000 views on YouTube to date and is known as Zane's comeback single.

2010–present: My World: My Future 
In 2010, he made special appearance at the ten-year anniversary of 106 & Park in Los Angeles with Ray J and Tony Marsley also known as AK. He announced he was releasing a mixtape entitled The Missing Link and a new single entitled "Put It In My Lap". March 1, 2010, Zane was featured on We Are The World: The Next Generation. The song has gotten over 2,000,000 views on YouTube alone. On March 8, 2011, Zane released a promo single off his mixtape The Missing Link Volume 1 called "Must Be Nice". On April 28, 2011, a rumor circulated that Zane signed to Cash Money Records. Later, the statement was proven false. On June 7, 2011, Zane released a new single called "My Girl". On February 2, 2012, Zane announced the title of his fourth album called My World: My Future along with a release of a single called "Sippin Hennessy" featuring Tupac Shakur. The song has gotten over 100,000 views on YouTube and 150,000 views on world star hip hop alone. On May 14, 2013, Zane released a new song called "When I Get Home" featuring Young Joe which is featured on his mixtapes Champagne & Dirty Sprite and R.A.W (Raps About Women). On September 18, 2013, Zane announced that the lead single off his upcoming album is called "Roof Gone". As of January 1, 2016, it is known that Zane is now working with battle rapper Levi Fresco to help ghostwrite his upcoming single ("Don't Spill My Liquor") and album ("Life I Live").

Other ventures

Acting career 
Zane acted in several movies and television shows, including Cuttin' da Mustard, The Parkers, One on one,   A Day in the Life, Motives, The Fighting Temptations, Dr. Dolittle 2, and Finding Forrester .

Money Making Muzik (MMM) 
In 2004, Zane signed a two-year agreement with MAM Group, Inc, Inc which granted him his own record label 3 Mill Entertainment (3ME) but then changed it to U.S. Entertainment in 2006. Then in 2010, he changed it again to Money Making Muzik (MMM) after buying B1 Music Group for a significant amount of money which is yet to be disclosed. In 2010, Zane signed many talents including spotlight Florida artist Soulja P and others.

Current artists
Lil Zane (2004–present)
Soulja P (2011–present)
D Phlo (2012–present)
Former artists
Real Young (2004–2006)
Drum Up (2005–2006)
Miss Honey (2010–2012)
Indyspensablz (2011–2012)
cool Gang (2012)
G$C (2012)
Ya Gurl Ree (2012)
 J RockStar (2012)
 Fly High Gang (2012)

Personal life 

In 2007, Zane attended St Andrews University.

In 2010, he had a daughter named Nina. He also has a son from a previous relationship named Isaac, who goes by the stage name Lil' Ike.

In 2012, Zane was injured in an early morning collision, leaving two of his crew members including security personnel in the ICU with internal bleeding. He was leaving a charity event in Tampa where he had performed. The power steering of the vehicle failed causing it to be stalled parallel to a busy highway where it was struck by a speeding SUV.

On September 14, 2014, Zane was sent to the hospital due to kidney failure.

Controversy

Young Buck 
On September 20, 2011, Lil Zane said on Street Disciplez Radio, G-Unit CEO 50 Cent would have made more money by signing him over former group member Young Buck. In addition to revealing his interest in working with 50 Cent, Zane also taunted Buck's music."Yo, he's garbage, he's garbage," Zane told radio host EI8HT referring to Young Buck. "He's garbage though, I don't think he's a good rapper. He might be a good person but you know, he probably feels the same way about me. So the feeling's mutual, you know? But I don't think he's the best rapper. I think I would have made 50 Cent a little more money. I think 50 needs to sign me, man. I think it needs to be 50 & 60 Cent or something because I'm more like 60 Cent. You know what I'm saying?

Game & Tyler, The Creator 
In September 2011, on an interview with DJ Vlad, Game named Lil Zane one of the wackest rappers. Zane responded on a freestyle over the song "Niggas in Paris". In the freestyle he disses not only the Game but also Tyler, the Creator.

Discography

Studio albums 

Note: In 2006, Lil Zane made an album called Under the Radar, but it was never released.

Compilation albums

Mixtapes

Singles 

Main-artist singles

Promotional singles

Featured singles

Filmography

Film

Television

References

External links 

 
 

1982 births
American male rappers
Capitol Records artists
Living people
Male actors from Atlanta
Rappers from Atlanta
Southern hip hop musicians
Pop rappers
21st-century American rappers
21st-century American male musicians
21st-century African-American musicians
20th-century African-American people